Cyclophora aurantiata is a moth in the  family Geometridae. It is found in Peru and Costa Rica.

Subspecies
Cyclophora aurantiata aurantiata (Peru)
Cyclophora aurantiata purgata Prout, 1938 (Costa Rica)

References

Moths described in 1904
Cyclophora (moth)
Moths of Central America
Moths of South America